Terence Clarke may refer to:

Terence Clarke (politician) (1904–1992), British army officer and politician
Terence Clarke (composer) (born 1935),  theatrical director and composer
Terrence Clarke (2001–2021), American basketball player

See also
Terence Clark (born 1934), British retired diplomat and writer
Terry Clarke (disambiguation)